This is a list of national federations that are members of World Aquatics, the international swimming federations. As at November 30, 2017, there are 209 countries/members (one national federation is allowed per sport nation).

Continental Associations
Members are grouped by continent, and there are 5 continental associations of which they can choose to be a member: 
Africa (52): African Swimming Confederation (CANA)
Americas (45): Swimming Union of the Americas (ASUA)
Asia (45): Asian Amateur Swimming Federation (AASF)
Europe (52): European Swimming League (LEN)
Oceania (16): Oceania Swimming Association (OSA)
Note: The number following each continental name is the number of FINA members which fall into the given geographical area. It is not necessarily the number of members in the continental association.

List of FINA National Federations
This list is based on FINA Directory, with founding and affiliated dates coming from FINA's 2009 membership report.

Note: Netherlands Antilles (AHO) was a member prior to its sports-nation status dissolution in 2011–12; Curaçao and Sint Maarten originated out of that. Tahiti (TAH) was also a member from 1992 onwards, but as of 2016 is no longer listed as a member on FINA's website.

As of 2019, Kiribati, Nauru, South Sudan, São Tomé and Príncipe and Tuvalu are not FINA members.

Anguilla, Curaçao, Faroe Islands, Gibraltar, Macau, Northern Mariana Islands, Sint Maarten, and Turks and Caicos Islands are not IOC members.

References

Water sport-related lists
FINA